Jerome Okide O. N. Okimo (born 8 June 1988) is a semi-professional footballer who is currently a player/coach for Barnet.

Club career

Non-league football
Okimo began his career at Chalfont St. Peter where he made 308 appearances. During his time there, Okimo went on trial at Football League side Gillingham in 2009 but missed out on a contract after injuring his Achilles tendon. After seven years at Chalfont St. Peter, Okimo moved to Isthmian League Premier Division side Wealdstone in the summer of 2013, going on to play an instrumental role in their promotion to the Conference South in 2014, making 38 league appearances.

Stevenage
In August 2014, Okimo followed former Wealdstone teammate Tom Pett (who signed for them in June 2014) to Stevenage, making his debut as an 83rd-minute substitute in a 1–0 win over Hartlepool United on 9 August 2014. Okimo was released after two seasons at the club in May 2016.

Braintree Town
In July 2016, he signed for National League side Braintree Town on a free transfer following his release from Stevenage.

Wealdstone
After leaving Braintree, Okimo re-signed for Wealdstone in July 2017. He captained the club to their 2019–20 National League South title win, playing 32 of the 33 league games and scoring 3 goals before the season was curtailed due to the COVID-19 pandemic, with Wealdstone promoted on points per game. He was named in the National League South Team of the Year as a result of his performances. Okimo started and captained every game of the 2020-21 season, scoring a solitary goal against rivals Barnet as Wealdstone ended the season in 19th place. On 14 June 2022 Jerome Okimo left the club to seek regular first team football.

Barnet
On 17 June 2022, Okimo agreed to join Barnet in the role of player/coach.

Career statistics

References

1988 births
Living people
English footballers
Association football defenders
Footballers from the London Borough of Ealing
Chalfont St Peter A.F.C. players
Wealdstone F.C. players
Stevenage F.C. players
Braintree Town F.C. players
Barnet F.C. players
English Football League players
National League (English football) players
Isthmian League players
Southern Football League players
Barnet F.C. non-playing staff
Association football coaches
Black British sportspeople